Dwight–Hooker Avenue Historic District is a national historic district located at Poughkeepsie, Dutchess County, New York.  It includes 17 contributing residential buildings in the most architecturally significant, turn of the 20th century neighborhood in Poughkeepsie.  Most of the houses were built between 1895 and 1915 and are in a variety of popular revival styles.  They are mostly  to  stories in height.

It was added to the National Register of Historic Places in 1982.

References

Houses on the National Register of Historic Places in New York (state)
Historic districts on the National Register of Historic Places in New York (state)
Houses in Poughkeepsie, New York
National Register of Historic Places in Poughkeepsie, New York